Burn Slow may refer to:

 Burn Slow (EP), 2018 EP by Jaira Burns
 "Burn Slow" (Jaira Burns song), 2017
 "Burn Slow" (Wiz Khalifa song), 2015